The 1906 Cincinnati football team was an American football team that represented the University of Cincinnati as an independent during the 1906 college football season. In their first season under head coach William Foley, the team compiled a 0–7–2 record.  Edward Adams was the team captain. The team played its home games at Carson Field in Cincinnati.

Schedule

References

Cincinnati
Cincinnati Bearcats football seasons
College football winless seasons
Cincinnati football